Batu Kawan (Jawi: باتو كاون) is an island in the city of Seberang Perai, Penang, Malaysia. It is geographically separated from the rest of Seberang Perai by the Jawi and Tengah rivers. , Batu Kawan contained a population of 5,537.

Long considered a quiet agricultural backwater, Batu Kawan is undergoing rapid development, which was sparked by the completion of the Second Penang Bridge that connects the town with Batu Maung on Penang Island in 2014. A host of multinational firms, including Boston Scientific, Western Digital Corporation, Bose Corporation, Dexcom and Bosch, have set up manufacturing plants within the Batu Kawan Industrial Park. In addition, Batu Kawan is home to Design Village, Malaysia's largest outlet mall.

Among the ongoing developments within Batu Kawan are an IKEA store, Aspen Vision City and Utropolis, the latter of which is expected to serve as a hub for tertiary education.

History 

The agricultural village of Batu Kawan had been in existence since the 19th century, when the area was home to sugar, coconut and rubber estates. In particular, sugar plantations in the area had been run by Chinese settlers as early as 1796. Granite was extracted from the area as well; the granite was then sent across the Penang Strait to George Town on tongkangs departing from the Batu Musang Jetty.

In the 1960s, the aforementioned plantations were cleared to make way for larger palm oil estates.

In 1990, the Penang Development Corporation (PDC), a statutory body of the Penang state government, acquired  of land in Batu Kawan. The Penang State Stadium, completed in 2000, was one of the first development projects undertaken by the PDC, followed by the Batu Kawan Industrial Park and the Penang Science Park.

In 2008, the Malaysian federal government commenced the construction of the Second Penang Bridge, which links Batu Kawan with Batu Maung on Penang Island. The completion of the bridge in 2014 proved to be a catalyst to Batu Kawan's contemporary development, with the town being touted as "Penang's third satellite township" after Bayan Baru on the island and Seberang Jaya in Central Seberang Perai. In 2012, the PDC launched the Bandar Cassia residential development, which is modelled after Singapore's Housing and Development Board schemes. This was soon followed by larger property developments, such as Utropolis and Aspen Vision City.

In 2015, the Penang state government declared the launch of a new development corridor within the South Seberang Perai District, which encompasses Batu Kawan and Nibong Tebal.

Geography 
Batu Kawan forms an island off Seberang Perai; it is physically cut off from the mainland by the Jawi River to the north and the Tengah River to the south. The town neighbours Juru (in Central Seberang Perai District) to the north, Simpang Ampat to the east and Nibong Tebal to the south.

Demographics 
Batu Kawan is situated within Mukim 13 of the South Seberang Perai District. , the mukim had a population of 5,537.

Transportation 

Lebuhraya Bandar Cassia is the main expressway within Batu Kawan. The highway is, in turn, linked to the North–South Expressway, which passes by the town.

The completion of the bridge in 2014 also brought about the rapid development of Batu Kawan. The bridge is a tolled expressway, with a toll plaza situated at the entrance of the bridge in Batu Kawan.

Batu Kawan is served by Rapid Penang's Congestion Alleviation Transport (CAT), a free-of-charge transit bus service within Batu Kawan.

Education 
Batu Kawan is served by two primary schools and one high school.

Primary schools
 SRK Batu Kawan
 SRJK (T) Ladang Batu Kawan
High schools
 SMK Batu Kawan
A number of tertiary institutions have planned to establish their campuses within Batu Kawan as well, including University of Hull, KDU University College and Peninsula College. In particular, the  KDU University campus, scheduled for completion by 2018, will be the largest tertiary institution within Batu Kawan.

Sports 

The Penang State Stadium, completed in 2000, is the main sporting stadium of the State of Penang and the home ground of the state's football association, Penang FA. The stadium, which has a capacity of 40,000, also played host to national-level sporting events, such as the 2000 Sukma Games.

Shopping 

Among the tenants within the mall are Gap, Timberland, Pierre Cardin, Padini, Adidas, Body Glove, Levi's, Guess, Samsonite, Esprit and Cotton On.

In 2017, the construction of the IKEA Batu Kawan store was launched by the Chief Minister of Penang, Lim Guan Eng.

Infrastructure 

The Batu Kawan Industrial Park encompasses the southern portion of Batu Kawan and is bounded by the Second Penang Bridge to the north. The  industrial zone has attracted a host of multinational firms, such as Boston Scientific, Bose Corporation, Bosch, ViTrox, Dexcom and Hewlett-Packard. In addition, a  gold and jewellery hub is being built within the industrial park.

The major residential developments within Batu Kawan include Aspen Vision City and Utropolis@Batu Kawan, undertaken by Aspen Group and Paramount Property respectively. The former includes a financial hub, a hospital, an international school and other commercial properties, whilst the latter consists of the campus of KDU University College and various other properties. Other ongoing projects within the town include the EcoHorizon residential development by EcoWorld.

In an effort to promote environmental conservation, all development projects within the town are required to abide by a 30% green area ruling, enacted by the Seberang Perai City Council.

See also 
 Nibong Tebal
 Simpang Ampat
 South Seberang Perai District

References

South Seberang Perai District
Towns in Penang